Navua is a town in Fiji. It had a population of 5,421 at the 2012. The food industry develops here. During colonial times, several sugar factories were built in the town, which were closed in 1922 after an economic crisis. The town has Navua FC, a football club that participates in the National Football League of Fiji.

References 

Populated places in Fiji
Namosi Province